Bonner Springs High School is the public secondary school in Bonner Springs, Kansas, United States.  It is the only high school operated by Bonner Springs–Edwardsville USD 204 school district.

Athletics
Bonner Springs High School, a KSHSAA 5A school, offers a variety of athletics. The Braves' athletic programs compete in the Frontier League.

Notable alumni
 David Jaynes, National Football League (NFL) football player
 Ed Nealy, National Basketball Association (NBA) basketball player

See also
 List of high schools in Kansas
 List of unified school districts in Kansas

References

External links
 School website
 USD 204 website

Schools in Wyandotte County, Kansas
Public high schools in Kansas